Sean Andrew Stokes (February 6, 1983 – July 30, 2007) was a United States Marine who posthumously received the Silver Star for actions while serving with 3rd Battalion, 1st Marines during the Second Battle of Fallujah.

Career 

Stokes enlisted in the U.S. Marine Corps shortly after the September 11, 2001 terrorist attacks.

Court martial 
In early 2004, then-Lance Corporal Stokes left his unit without permission in order to help a family member escape from domestic violence. After moving her to a new house, Stokes returned to Camp Pendleton. Stokes was subsequently court martialled, and reduced to the rank of Private.

Subsequent career 

He was then transferred to Lima Company, 3rd Battalion, 1st Marines (3/1). He was 21 years old, the lowest-ranking member of 2nd Squad, and one of the most senior rifleman in the platoon.

A few months after arriving at 3/1, Stokes deployed to Fallujah, Iraq, where in November 2004, he participated in Operation Phantom Fury. He killed nine enemy terrorists in Fallujah.

In 2005, Stokes returned to Iraq, this time near the city of Haditha.
3/1 deployed again in 2007, and Stokes, by now a Corporal, was selected to serve on the Battalion Commander's Personal Security Detachment.

Awards and honors

Death 
On 30 July 2007, while escorting the Battalion Commander across 3/1's Area of Operations in Iraq's Tharthar region, the convoy came to a section of road which had been rendered impassable by an improvised explosive device (IED) several days prior. Following protocol, Stokes dismounted his vehicle and began sweeping the surrounding area before attempting to move the convoy around the crater. However, there was a well-concealed IED, which detonated as he stepped on it, wounding him fatally.

In popular culture

Print media 
Military historian Patrick K. O'Donnell was embedded with Stokes' platoon for one year leading up to and during their deployment to Fallujah, and Stokes is a prominent figure in his 2006 non-fiction book We Were One: Shoulder to Shoulder with the Marines Who Took Fallujah.

Shootout! 
In 2006, Stokes was featured in an episode of Shootout! on the History Channel entitled "D-Day: Fallujah", wherein his actions in 2004 are dramatized while he and other Marines recount the details.

Silver Star Citation 

For Services as Set Forth in the Following Citation:

For conspicuous gallantry and intrepidity in action against the enemy while serving as Rifleman, First Platoon, Company L, Third Battalion, First Marines, FIRST Marine Division, II Marine Expeditionary Force, from 9 November 2004 to 18 November 2004, in support of Operation IRAQI FREEDOM 03–05. Throughout nine days of high intensity urban combat in Fallujah, Corporal Stokes fought as his unit's point man, requiring him to repeatedly be the first man to engage enemy forces. On 9 and 11 November, Corporal Stokes led a four-man element into a building held by armed enemy. As they entered the building, his element was engaged with automatic rifle fire from within. Fearless in the face of danger, Corporal Stokes pressed forward in the close confines of the building against the enemy fire and killed the insurgent before his fellow Marines could be injured. On 17 November, an enemy hand grenade exploded beneath Corporal Stokes as he cleared a small house, severely wounding him. Though dazed and wounded from the blast, and rather than attempting to save himself and exit the building, he chose to ensure the Marines around him were protected and began suppressing the enemy within the house with his rifle. The fire he provided allowed the rest of his team to reach a covered position outside the house, where they organized an assault and reentered the building, killing the enemy in a counterattack. Corporal Stokes fought through Fallujah with the resolve of closing on the enemy, while protecting the Marines around him at all costs. By his extraordinary heroism in the face of extreme danger, zealous initiative, and exceptional dedication to duty, Corporal Stokes reflected great credit upon himself and upheld the highest traditions of the Marine Corps and the United States Naval Service.

References

Further reading

External links 
 
 
 

Recipients of the Silver Star
United States Marines
United States Marine Corps personnel of the Iraq War
1983 births
2007 deaths
American military personnel killed in the Iraq War